These are the results of 2017 BWF World Senior Championships' 65+ events.

Men's singles

Seeds
 Johan Croukamp (champion, gold medal)
 Henry Paynter (final, silver medal)
 Per Dabelsteen (quarterfinals)
 Carl-Johan Nybergh (semifinals, bronze medal)
 Peter Emptage (first round)
 Hubert Miranda (semifinals, bronze medal)
 Hirohisa Toshijima (second round)
 Christian Hansen (quarterfinals)

Finals

Top half

Section 1

Section 2

Bottom half

Section 3

Section 4

Women's singles

Seeds
 Yuriko Okemoto (semifinals, bronze medal)
 Siew Har Hong (final, silver medal)

Group A

Group B

Group C

Group D

Finals

Men's doubles

Seeds
 Per Dabelsteen / Steen Adam Kioerbo (quarterfinals)
 Peter Emptage / Graham Holt (champions, gold medal)
 Johan Croukamp /  Carl-Johan Nybergh (semifinals, bronze medal)
 Sushil Kumar Patet / Surendra Singh Pundir (semifinals, bronze medal)

Finals

Top half

Section 1

Section 2

Bottom half

Section 3

Section 4

Women's doubles

Seeds
 Betty Bartlett / Eileen M. Carley (champions, gold medal)
 Sumiko Kaneko / Yuriko Okemoto (final, silver medal)

Group A

Group B

Finals

Mixed doubles

Seeds
 Christian Hansen / Gitte Attle Rasmussen (final, silver medal)
 Peter Emptage / Betty Bartlett (semifinals, bronze medal)

Group A

Group B

Group C

Group D

Finals

References

Men's singles
Results

Women's singles
Group A Results
Group B Results
Group C Results
Group D Results
Finals Results

Men's doubles
Results

Women's doubles
Group A Results
Group B Results
Finals Results

Mixed doubles
Group A Results
Group B Results
Group C Results
Group D Results
Finals Results

2017 BWF World Senior Championships